Jeff King may refer to:

 Jeff King (mushing) (born 1956), American multiple winner of the Iditarod Trail Sled Dog Race
 Jeff King (baseball) (born 1964), American major league baseball player
 Jeff F. King, Canadian television producer and screenwriter
 Jeff King (bodybuilder),  American bodybuilder and former title holder of the Universe Championships
 Jeff King (football), English football manager and club-owner
 Jeff King (American football) (born 1983), American football player
 Jeff King (Navajo) (1865–1964), Native American singer (medicine man)
 Jeff King (jockey), British steeplechase rider from the 1960s–'80s
 Jeff King (politician) (born 1975), Republican member of the Kansas House of Representatives
 Jeff King (footballer) (born 1995), English footballer
 Jeffrey King (politician) (1940–2020), Canadian politician, lawyer and priest

See also 
 Geoffrey King (disambiguation)